FYI Daily is a 60-second daily entertainment news round-up. Broadcast on ITV2, ITV3, ITV4 and ITVBe, it generally airs mid-way through films. Prior to 2010 it was simply branded as Entertainment News, and before that was Showbiz News, which was initially created for the ITN News Channel. It is produced by ITN Productions. The theme music that runs throughout the programme was created by the production company Noise Fusion.

The programme is similar to (the now defunct) BBC Three's 60 Seconds in terms of running time.

Presenters

External links
ITN Productions - Short Form Originals

2010 British television series debuts
2010s British television series
2020s British television series
ITN
ITV news shows